SamTrans (stylized as samTrans; officially the San Mateo County Transit District) is a public transport agency in and around San Mateo, California, in the San Francisco Bay Area. It provides bus service throughout San Mateo County and into portions of San Francisco and Palo Alto. SamTrans also operates commuter shuttles to BART stations and community shuttles. Service is largely concentrated on the east side of the Santa Cruz Mountains, and, in the central county, I-280, leaving coast-side service south of Pacifica spotty and intermittent.

SamTrans is constituted as a special district under California state law. It is governed by a board of nine appointed members; two county Supervisors, one "transportation expert" appointed by the county Board of Supervisors, three city council members appointed by the cities in the county to represent the county's judicial districts, and three citizens appointed by the other six board members (including one from the coastside).

The district was established in 1976 and consolidated eleven different municipal bus systems serving the county. One year later, SamTrans began operation of mainline bus service to San Francisco. Shuttle service began in 2000.

In addition to fixed-route bus and paratransit operations, the district participates in the administration of the San Jose-San Francisco commuter rail line Caltrain. SamTrans also provides administrative support for the San Mateo County Transportation Authority, a separate board charged with administering the half-cent (0.5 percent) sales tax levy that funds highway and transit improvement projects.

History 

SamTrans was formed in 1976 with the consolidation of 11 different city bus systems throughout San Mateo County. Today, SamTrans operates 48 fixed bus routes and a paratransit service branded Redi-Wheels (Bayside) or RediCoast (Coastside) on an annual budget of $177 million.

Voters in San Mateo County approved the formation of the San Mateo County Transit District in 1974. SamTrans purchased the local bus fleet from Greyhound in 1977, and the SamTrans fleet exceeded 200 buses by 1980.

In August 2013 the agency merged two routes along El Camino Real into the single all-day ECR route with 15-minute headways, briefly stemming a long-term decline in bus ridership that began in the early 1990s. Ridership on SamTrans buses was 52,140 passengers per weekday in November 2009; by November 2017, it had fallen to 37,830 bus passengers per weekday and continues to decline, further threatening the agency's budget. According to a route-level analysis, in 2014, four lines accounted for more than half of all weekday riders: ECR, 120, 292, and 122/28, with ECR alone accounting for more than one quarter of all weekday riders.

SamTrans is predicting a $28 million budget deficit by 2024 if it maintains existing levels of service and revenue sources, driven largely by growing employee pension obligations. In November 2017 the agency announced that it would place another half-cent (0.5 percent) sales tax, dubbed "Get Us Moving", on the county's November 2018 ballot. Officially SamTrans has not developed a spending plan for the estimated $80 million in annual revenues, but according to the San Mateo Daily Journal, "A very preliminary proposal suggested half of the money go toward SamTrans and Caltrain, both facing financial difficulty. The remaining revenue could be allocated in a manner similar to the current countywide transportation tax that supports projects covering highways, local roads, grade separations, bikes, pedestrians and other transit-related expenditures." The Staff Report stated that half the revenue raised by the proposed tax would go to public transit projects, with the remainder going to highway/interchange improvements (22.5%), local safety/pothole repairs (12.5%), regional connections (10%), and bicycle/pedestrian infrastructure (5%). Measure W passed on the November 2018 ballot; requiring a two-thirds majority, 66.9% of voters approved the measure.

Facilities 
SamTrans headquarters are at 1250 San Carlos Avenue in a  building built in 1979 and acquired in 1990, one block southwest of the  Caltrain station.

SamTrans has two maintenance bases. North Base opened in 1988. It is in South San Francisco, just north of San Francisco International Airport and adjacent to U.S. 101 and I-380. South Base opened in 1984 near the San Carlos Airport, east of U.S. 101 off Redwood Shores Parkway. Primary maintenance is carried out at North Base, which can store 200 buses. South Base can store 150 buses.

Bus service 
Currently, SamTrans serves the cities of San Mateo County, including Atherton, Belmont, Burlingame, Colma, Daly City, East Palo Alto, Foster City, Half Moon Bay, Hillsborough, Menlo Park, Millbrae, Pacifica, Palo Alto, Redwood City, San Bruno, San Carlos, San Mateo, and South San Francisco. Most routes provide connecting service to BART, Caltrain, or both. There is also regular scheduled service to San Francisco International Airport (SFO) and Transbay Terminal in downtown San Francisco.

Unlike most large transit operators in the Bay Area, SamTrans outsources to private contractors the operation of a number of its routes. The current contract operator for Peninsula mainline, Coastside and paratransit services is MV Transportation.

SamTrans previously operated special service for a couple of Bay Area events such as San Francisco 49ers home football games and the quirky Bay to Breakers footrace in San Francisco.

Route designations 

Notes

SamTrans reorganized its bus routes in August 1999 and adopted a new route designation system to identify service types, geographical coverage, and connections to rail services.

Routes 

Local routes have either two or three digits or a special designation (e.g., ECR). For three-digit routes, the first digit identifies a rail connection:

1 – Connection to BART stations only (primarily routes in Daly City, Colma, South San Francisco and San Bruno)
2 – Connection to Caltrain stations only (primarily routes south of Millbrae)
3 – Connection to both BART and Caltrain stations (three routes have this designation: ECR, previously designated 390, provides service between Palo Alto and Daly City, 397 provides overnight service between San Francisco and Palo Alto as a part of the All Nighter network, and 399 provides overnight service between Daly City and San Francisco International Airport as a part of the All Nighter network.)

All two-digit routes are community service routes. Most of these routes do not connect with rail and operate on school days.

Express routes 
Express bus routes were designated by a letter and X. In December 2009, six express routes (DX, FX, MX, NX, PX, and RX) were eliminated due to budget constraints; a seventh, route CX, was redesignated Route 118. In August 2018, the last remaining express route, KX, was folded into Route 398.

In April 2017, SamTrans identified fifteen potential express bus routes connecting the Peninsula counties of San Francisco, San Mateo, and Santa Clara. Most of the potential routes ran along U.S. 101, and some were planned to take advantage of managed lanes to provide speedier service. By June 2018, the list of potential bus routes was reduced to six. The draft final report was released in November 2018, and the Board adopted it in December. SamTrans anticipates relaunching express bus service in August 2019 from Foster City to downtown San Francisco along U.S. 101, followed by a second route in Spring/Summer of 2020 from Palo Alto to western San Francisco along I-280. The Foster City–San Francisco route was launched as FCX in August 2019, but ridership and frequency have been adversely impacted by the COVID-19 pandemic in the San Francisco Bay Area. The launch of the other proposed express route planned for Phase 1, PAX (Palo Alto to western San Francisco), has been delayed indefinitely. Phase 2 of the express bus plan includes two additional routes: EPX (East Palo Alto to San Bruno) and an un-named route (San Mateo to downtown San Francisco); EPX is anticipated to launch in 2023 after SamTrans completes acquisition of XE40 battery-electric buses.

Fares 
Since January 1, 2020

Notes

SamTrans offers bus tokens for adult and youth local fares ($16 and $10, respectively) in packages of ten. Multiple tokens or combinations of tokens and cash are accepted for journeys requiring higher fares. Tokens are promoted as being easier to handle than cash, and also include discounts. For example, a package of tokens includes two free rides assuming the others are worth $2 each (adult) or $1.25 each (youth).

SamTrans does not provide transfers but offers a Day Pass which allows unlimited rides on local routes and a credit on higher-cost routes.  The cost of the Day Pass is thrice the one-way fare on the local routes for adults, youth, and seniors/disabled/Medicare cardholders.

As of December 22, 2010, Clipper card fare machines became fully operational throughout the system, allowing riders to pay fares using Clipper card, a transit smart card that is also accepted by most other Bay Area transit agencies.

Clipper cards come in four varieties: adult, youth, senior and disabled (which includes Medicare cardholders). Adult Clipper cards may be obtained from a wide variety of vendors, but youth, senior and disabled Clipper cards must be obtained from SamTrans or another Bay Area transit agency. Each Clipper card contains some sort of stored value (e.g., monthly passes, "Clipper Cash" e-funds used for transit fares) and the history of recent trips using the card. Clipper cards generally confer an approximately 10% discount relative to cash fares.

With the exception of youth summer passes, all SamTrans monthly passes must be loaded onto a Clipper card. Youth, senior and disabled monthly passes may only be loaded onto a corresponding Clipper card obtained from SamTrans or another Bay Area transit agency.

To ride SamTrans with Clipper card, the card must be "tagged" (read) by the Clipper card reader installed at the front of the bus near the farebox.  The reader checks for a SamTrans monthly pass and local-fare credits from other agencies, computes the remaining fare and (if there is one) collects it in Clipper Cash.  Note that northbound passengers on route KX to San Francisco must "tag" their Clipper card twice: once when boarding within San Mateo County (which collects a local fare or equivalent) and once before exiting in San Francisco (which collects any remaining fare).

Caltrain monthly passes (with two or more zones) and VTA monthly passes (that have been tagged on VTA in the last two hours) are honored on SamTrans as a local-fare credit.  To use a local-fare credit from a monthly pass loaded onto a Clipper card on higher-cost routes, the remaining fare must be collected in Clipper Cash.

New fareboxes were installed in June 2011.  The fareboxes collect fares, issue new magnetic striped tickets (e.g., day passes, change cards) and process previously issued magnetic striped tickets (e.g., day passes, youth summer passes, change cards).  When a patron does not have exact change, a change card is issued with a cash value that can be redeemed at a future farebox transaction for up to a year.

Up to three kids under 5 with fare-paying rider can board for free.

Fleet 

SamTrans currently has a fleet of 296 buses of various sizes for its fixed-route service. Fifty-five are articulated buses made by New Flyer Industries with the 10 m (35 ft) and 12 m (40 ft) buses with low flooring, are made by the Gillig Corporation. Each bus is equipped with GPS tracking providing both visual and voice next-stop announcements, and are accessible to passengers in wheelchairs and those with limited mobility.

In 2009, SamTrans added 135 custom made Gillig low floor buses to their fleet, numbered 400-490, 500-539 & 2900-2903, replacing 137 older Gillig Phantom buses in their fleet.

In 2018, SamTrans placed an order for 10 Proterra 40-foot Catalyst BE40s buses as a first step towards the goal to have an all-electric fleet by 2033. The battery electric buses are expected to enter revenue service in early 2019, and a charging station will be installed at each SamTrans maintenance facility.

See also 
 AC Transit
 Bay Area Rapid Transit
 Caltrain
 Clipper card
 List of SamTrans bus lines
 Muni Metro
 San Francisco Municipal Railway
 Santa Clara Valley Transportation Authority

References

External links 
MV Transportation
SamTrans Official site
Coastside Opportunity Center

 
County government agencies in California
Bus transportation in California
Public transportation in San Mateo County, California
Public transportation in Santa Clara County, California
Public transportation in San Francisco
Transit agencies in California
Special districts of California